Rastrigino is a rural locality (a village) in Fominskoye Rural Settlement, Gorokhovetsky District, Vladimir Oblast, Russia. The population was 37 as of 2010.

Geography 
Rastrigino is located 36 km southwest of Gorokhovets (the district's administrative centre) by road. Pochinki is the nearest rural locality.

References 

Rural localities in Gorokhovetsky District